Consort Zhang may refer to:

Zhang Yan (empress) (died 163 BC), wife of Emperor Hui of Han
Empress Zhang (Liu Shan's first wife) (died 237)
Empress Zhang (Liu Shan's second wife) (died after 264)
Empress Zhang (Cao Fang) (died after 254)
Empress Dowager Zhang (Former Zhao) (died 313), concubine of Liu Yuan
Zhang Huiguang (died 313), wife of Liu Cong
Empress Zhang (Later Zhao) (died 349), wife of Shi Zun
Honoured Lady Zhang ( 396), concubine of Emperor Xiaowu of Jin
Empress Zhang (Later Qin) ( 402), wife of Yao Xing
Empress Dowager Zhang (Liu Song dynasty) (died 426), concubine of Liu Yu
Empress Zhang (Liang dynasty) (died 552 or later), wife of Xiao Dong
Zhang Yao'er (506–570), wife of Chen Baxian
Empress Zhang (Tang dynasty) (died 762), wife of Emperor Suzong
Empress Zhang (Later Liang) (died 913), wife of Zhu Yougui
Consort Zhang (Zhu Zhen) (892–915)
Empress Zhang (Wang Yanzheng's wife) ( 943)
Consort Zhang (Renzong) (1024–1054), concubine of Emperor Renzong of Song
Empress Zhang (Hongxi) (1379–1442)
Empress Zhang (Hongzhi) (1471–1541)
Empress Zhang (Jiajing) (died 1537)
Empress Zhang (Tianqi) (1606–1644)
Consort Qing (Xianfeng) (1840–1885), concubine of the Xianfeng Emperor